Turris baudoni is an extinct species of sea snail, a marine gastropod mollusk in the family Turridae, the turrids.

Description

Distribution
Fossils of this marine species were found in Eocene strata off Paris, France.

References

 Boury E. de, 1899. Révision des Pleurotomes éocènes du Bassin de Paris. La Feuille des Jeunes Naturalistes ser. 3, 29(343): 115-123

External links
 Mineralienatlas - Fossilienatlas: Turris baudoni

baudoni
Gastropods described in 1866